The Democratic Republic of the Congo women's national handball team is the national team of the Democratic Republic of the Congo. It is governed by the Democratic Republic of the Congo Handball Federation and takes part in international handball competitions.

Results

World Championships
 2013 – 20th
 2015 – 24th
 2019 – 20th

African Nations Championship
 1992 – 8th (as Zaire)
 2002 – 8th
 2004 – 7th
 2006 – 6th
 2008 – 5th
 2010 – 8th
 2012 – 3rd
 2014 – 2nd
 2016 – 8th
 2018 – 3rd
 2021 – 6th
 2022 – 6th

Squad
Squad for the 2019 World Women's Handball Championship.

Head coach: Célestin Mpoua

References

External links

IHF profile

Women's national handball teams
Hanbdall
National team